The 1995 Oklahoma State Cowboys football team represented the Oklahoma State University during the 1995 NCAA Division I-A football season. They participated as members of the Big 8 Conference. They played their home games at Lewis Field in Stillwater, Oklahoma. They were coached by head coach Bob Simmons.

Schedule

After the season

The 1996 NFL Draft was held on April 20–21, 1996. The following Cowboy was selected.

References

Oklahoma State
Oklahoma State Cowboys football seasons
Oklahoma State Cowboys football